Mecynome is a genus of longhorn beetles of the subfamily Lamiinae, containing the following species:

 Mecynome aenescens Bates, 1885
 Mecynome quadrispinosus (Franz, 1954)

References

Parmenini